This is a discography for Fela Anikulapo Kuti, or simply Fela, a Nigerian multi-instrumentalist musician and composer, pioneer of afrobeat music, human rights activist, and political maverick.

References

External links
 Fela Kuti discography at Discogs

Discographies of Nigerian artists
Fela Kuti albums